Brajan Nenezić (born 1 September 1953) is a Montenegrin football manager and former player.

Playing career
During the 1970s and 1980s, Nenezić made over 300 appearances for Sutjeska Nikšić in the Yugoslav First League and Second League combined.

Managerial career
During his managerial career, Nenezić served as manager of Sutjeska Nikšić on several occasions, lastly in 2015. He was also manager of Leotar in the 2006–07 season.

Honours
Sutjeska Nikšić
 Yugoslav Second League: 1983–84

References

External links
 
 

1953 births
Living people
Footballers from Nikšić
Yugoslav footballers
Montenegrin footballers
Association football midfielders
FK Leotar players
FK Sutjeska Nikšić players
Yugoslav Second League players
Yugoslav First League players
Serbia and Montenegro football managers
Montenegrin football managers
FK Sutjeska Nikšić managers
FK Mornar managers
FK Leotar managers
Premier League of Bosnia and Herzegovina managers
Montenegrin expatriate football managers
Expatriate football managers in Bosnia and Herzegovina
Montenegrin expatriate sportspeople in Bosnia and Herzegovina